The 1987 World Mountain Running Championships was the 3rd edition of the global Mountain running competition, World Mountain Running Championships, organised by the World Mountain Running Association and was held in Lenzerheide, Switzerland on 23 August 1987.

Results

Men individual
Distance 14.7 km, difference in height 1480 m (climb).

Men team

Men short distance

Men short distance team

Men junior
Individual

Men junior team

Women individual

Women team

References

World Mountain Running Championships
World Long Distance Mountain Running